Laura is a village in Tuscany, central Italy,  administratively a frazione of the comune of Crespina Lorenzana, province of Pisa.

Laura lies at the slopes of the hill of Lorenzana. It is about 24 km from Pisa and 8 km from the municipal seat of Crespina.

References

Bibliography 
 

Frazioni of the Province of Pisa